St Eugene's College (Irish: Coláiste Naomh Eoghan) was a secondary school in Roslea, County Fermanagh, Northern Ireland. It was a voluntary maintained co-educational school and was within the Western Education and Library Board area.

The school opened in 1968 and closed in 2017.

References

Secondary schools in County Fermanagh
Catholic secondary schools in Northern Ireland
1968 establishments in Northern Ireland
2017 disestablishments in Northern Ireland
Educational institutions established in 1968
Educational institutions disestablished in 2017